Anand is one of the 182 Legislative Assembly constituencies of Gujarat state in India.

It is part of Anand district.

List of segments
This assembly seat represents the following segments

 Anand Taluka (Part) Villages – Lambhvel, Jol, Valasan, Sandesar, Meghva Gana, Gana, Vans Khiliya, Jitodiya, Hadgood, Jakhariya, Navli, Khandhali, Anand (M), Mogri, Gamdi, Bakrol, Vallabh Vidyanagar (M), Karamsad (M), Vithal Udyognagar (INA)

Members of Legislative Assembly
1972 - Bhupatsinh Vaghela, Indian National Congress
1975 - Ranchhodbhai Solanki, Indian National Congress
1980 - Ranchhodbhai Solanki, Indian National Congress
1985 - Ranchhodbhai Solanki, Indian National Congress
1990 - Ghanshyam Patel, Janata Party
1995 - Dilipbhai Patel, Bharatiya Janta Party
1998 - Dilipbhai Patel, Bharatiya Janta Party
2002 - Dilipbhai Patel, Bharatiya Janta Party
2007 - Jyotsanaben Patel, Bharatiya Janata Party
2012 - Dilipbhai Manibhai Patel, Bharatiya Janata Party
2014 - Rohit Jashu (by poll), Bharatiya Janata Party

Election results

2022

2017

2014

2012

See also
 List of constituencies of Gujarat Legislative Assembly
 Anand district

References

External links
 

Assembly constituencies of Gujarat
Anand district